"Plain folks" is a form of propaganda and a logical fallacy. A plain folks argument is one in which the speaker presents themselves as an average Joe — a common person who can understand and empathize with a listener's concerns.

The most important part of this appeal is the speaker's portrayal of themselves as someone who has had a similar experience to the listener and knows why they may be skeptical or cautious about accepting the speaker's point of view. In this way, the speaker gives the audience a sense of trust and comfort, believing that the speaker and the audience share common goals and that they thus should agree with the speaker. Also using an "ordinary background," such as a park or a building, depending on the item you are advertising, will usually give it a higher possibility of more customers.

References 
 

Propaganda techniques
Deception